Marina Aranha Zablith (born 4 March 1987) is a female water polo player of Brazil.

She was part of the Brazilian team at the Water polo at the 2011 Pan American Games, and 2015 World Aquatics Championships, and 2017 World Aquatics Championships.
She participated in the 2016 Summer Olympics.

See also
 Brazil at the 2015 World Aquatics Championships

References

External links
http://www.gettyimages.com/photos/marina-zablith?excludenudity=true&sort=mostpopular&mediatype=photography&phrase=marina%20zablith&family=editorial
http://www.zimbio.com/photos/Marina+Zablith/Water+Polo+Olympics+Day+8/0vGqb-oegLL

Brazilian female water polo players
Living people
Place of birth missing (living people)
1987 births
Olympic water polo players of Brazil
Water polo players at the 2016 Summer Olympics
Pan American Games medalists in water polo
Pan American Games bronze medalists for Brazil
Water polo players at the 2015 Pan American Games
Medalists at the 2015 Pan American Games